The Colorado crime family, also known as the Smaldone crime family, Denver crime family, Denver Mafia or the Mountain Mafia was an Italian-American organized crime syndicate based in Pueblo and Denver, Colorado. Pete and Sam Carlino’s bootlegging organization was the foundation of the Denver Mob, which was later taken over by Giuseppe “Little Caesar” Roma. Roma’s organization evolved into the modern Denver branch of the La Cosa Nostra of which is known today as the Smaldone crime family. Roma expanded their criminal operations into extortion, loan sharking, drugs, bookmaking, and more. It is believed by federal authorities that the Denver Mafia went defunct in the 2000s after the death of Clarence Smaldone, however, evidence suggests that they still have a small but significant presence in the Colorado state, particularly in mountain towns.

Carlino Brothers 
Pete and Sam Carlino were southern Colorado's most notorious bootleggers. From 1922 to 1931, they controlled most of the bootlegging territories south of Denver. By the late 1920s, the Carlino brothers had moved to Denver and planned on expanding their liquor empire to encompass the entire state of Colorado. On January 25, 1931, Denver bootlegger Giuseppe "Joe" Roma set up a "Bootleggers Convention" to avert an all-out war between the Carlino's and the other bootleggers. Police arrested 29 people at the meeting; all but one of whom had prior arrests. Pete Carlino and the others were charged but released; Roma was not at the meeting. District Attorney Carr was publicly condemned Mayor Stapleton for not prosecuting the bootleggers.

On March 17, 1931, Pete Carlino's opulent home at 3357 Federal Boulevard exploded. Initially, police suspected it was members of rival gangs who had set the blast. Federal undercover agent Lawrence Baldesareli informed police that it had been Pete Carlino himself who had planned the arson, in order to collect the insurance money for the blast. His empire was flagging and he was quickly running out of money. Joe Petralia, Chris Murkuri, and Carlino's cousin Dan Colletti were convicted for setting the blast.

On May 8, 1931, Sam Carlino was killed in his home by Bruno Mauro. Carlino's cousin James Colletti was wounded in the attack but survived. Sam Carlino's wife and Colletti initially informed police that Mauro was the shooter. When the trial approached, Colletti had fled the area and Mrs. Carlino refused to testify in court against Mauro for fear of her family's lives.

After his brother's assassination, Pete Carlino went into hiding. According to police testimony on an unrelated matter, Lucille Crupi claimed that she met Carlino while in Milwaukee in early June 1931. She claimed that he was dropping off a shipment of booze and was picking up another load to return to Colorado. On June 19, 1931, Carlino was captured hiding in his cousin's farmhouse outside Pueblo. On June 25, 1931. Joe Roma posted Pete Carlino's $5,000 bond, using his house as collateral. Contrary to popular belief, Roma and Carlino were not enemies; rather, they had a working relationship that spanned over eight years.

On September 10, 1931, Pete Carlino was killed, shot twice in the back and once in the head at close range. He was on his way to visit Joe Petralia at the prison in Cañon City.  Carlino's body was placed under the Siloam Road bridge just outside Pueblo. After two days, the body had not been discovered, so the killers returned and dragged it onto the road. An anonymous phone call made to Carlino's wife informed her where the body could be found. This ended the Carlinos' reign of control of the Colorado bootlegging era.

Joseph Roma 
Giuseppe Roma became Joseph Roma.  In the prohibition era from 1920 to 1933, crime families formed all over the country to profit from bootlegging.   Operating from his grocery store as a front business, Roma became the de facto boss of criminal activity in Denver.

Smaldone Brothers 
The three brothers, Eugene, Clyde, and Clarence owned and operated Gaetano's Italian restaurant, a popular spot in North Denver, for years. The rise of the family began in 1933 after crime boss bootlegger, Joe Roma, was found riddled with seven bullets in the front parlor of his North Denver home. Six of the shots were to Roma's head. His wife, Nettie, found him slumped in his favorite overstuffed chair. The Smaldone's were questioned but not charged.

Clyde Smaldone 
Clyde was born in 1906; his lengthy criminal record began with a burglary charge in 1920. He served 18 months in Leavenworth for bootlegging in 1933. Three years later he served time for the attempted bombing murder of a local man named Leon Barnes. Paroled in 1949, he confessed to paying protection money for his Central City gambling enterprises.

In 1953, Clyde and Eugene made headlines after a publicized raid of one of their gambling dens in Brighton, Colorado. Later that year both brothers were found guilty of jury tampering, fined $24,000 each, and sentenced to 60 years in prison. After spending 13 months in jail, the brothers received a new trial. Clyde pleaded guilty to a lesser tampering charge and was sentenced to 12 years and fined $10,000. He was paroled in 1962. In 1967, Clyde and several others, including Eugene's son, were arrested on gambling charges and for running a $100,000-a-week bookmaking operation.

Clyde died at The Cedars Nursing Home at the age of 91, in January 1998. His son told reporters that despite his father's criminal past, he had a soft side and donated to local orphanages, churches, and schools.

Eugene Smaldone 
Eugene was recognized as Northern Colorado's leading crime figure and described as the patriarch of the Denver Crime Family. Although suspected of taking part in several killings, Eugene was never indicted for murder. Eugene's arrest record showed entries for auto theft, bootlegging, and income tax evasion. A local law official described Eugene as, "...the schoolteacher type. He wore glasses. Very polite. Very civil." His final prison sentence was in 1983. The charges were for operating a loan shark business out of Gaetano's. Eugene along with Clarence, and a nephew, Paul Clyde "Fat Paulie" Villano, pleaded guilty to the charges which also included illegal gun possession. Eugene Smaldone died in March 1992 of a heart attack at the age of 81. After Eugene's funeral, a relative wrote to the Denver newspapers complaining of the pain the media had caused the family and pleaded to be left alone.

Clarence "Chauncey" Smaldone 
Clarence Smaldone (1916-November 2006) was considered the underboss of a two-member mob family. Clarence served eight years in a Fort Worth prison hospital for the 1983 loan sharking conviction. He was released in 1991.

Current status 
Eugene Smaldone's grandson, also named Eugene Smaldone, is the last surviving member of the Smaldone crime family. Although not substantiated by officials, rumors as of recent as 2016 have suggested the existence of the Smaldone Family in various mountain towns in Colorado.

Bosses 
 1923–1933 – Joe "Little Caesar" Roma — assassinated by the Carlino brothers
 1928–1931 – Pete Carlino 
 1933–1950 – Charles Blanda 
 1950–1969 – Vincenzo Colletti
 1969–1975 – Joseph "Scotty" Spinuzzi
 1975–1992 – Eugene "Checkers" Smaldone
 1992–2006 – Clarence "Chauncey" Smaldone

References

External links
Denver Crime Family on AmericanMafia.com
Article in Rocky Mountain News 
Denver's Brother Hoods
Mountain Mafia
Smaldone, Denver's Mob Family, by Matt Masich, Sept./Oct. 2012.
Denver Home Conceals Booby-trapped Secret Mobster Hideaway Denver 7 The Denver Channel

History of Denver
Gangs in Colorado
Italian-American crime families
Italian-American culture in Colorado